1,4,6-Androstatriene-3,17-dione (ATD) is a potent irreversible aromatase inhibitor that inhibits estrogen biosynthesis by permanently binding and inactivating aromatase in adipose and peripheral tissue.  It is used to control estrogen synthesis.

ATD was present in some over-the-counter bodybuilding supplements until 2009, as well as Topical ATD solutions that work transdermally.  The product was developed and commercialized in the dietary supplement market place by industry journeyman Bruce Kneller, who holds a United States Patent for use of the compound and related compounds (#7,939,517) and Gaspari Nutrition. ATD has many names in sports supplements including: 1,4,6 etiollochan-dione, 3, 17-keto-etiochol-triene, androst-1,4,6-triene-3,17-dione and many others. These all refer to CAS# 633-35-2.

ATD may cause a positive test for the anabolic steroid Boldenone, of which it is a possible metabolite and production contaminant. ATD is also prohibited in amateur and professional sports which forbids aromatase inhibitors.

A related agent is exemestane (Aromasin).

References

Further reading
 

Androstanes
Aromatase inhibitors
Bodybuilding supplements
Diketones